Kalmychyok is a rural locality (a selo) in Panino, Paninsky District, Voronezh Oblast, Russia. The population was 174 as of 2010. There are six streets.

Geography 
Kalmychyok is located 8 km north of Panino (the district's administrative centre) by road. Khavenka is the nearest rural locality.

References 

Rural localities in Paninsky District